Ethiopia is currently divided into eleven regions and two chartered cities. Each region or chartered city has its own flag and emblem.

Regional flags

Regional emblems

See also 
Flag of Ethiopia
Emblem of Ethiopia
Regions of Ethiopia
Regional flag

References

External links 
 http://www.crwflags.com/fotw/flags/et-.html
 Flag of Ethiopia-Britannica

Flags and emblems
Flags of Ethiopia
Ethiopia Regions
Flags
Ethiopia